Cournon is a commune in the Morbihan department of Brittany in north-western France. Inhabitants of Cournon are called in French Cournonnais.

See also
Communes of the Morbihan department

References

External links

Mayors of Morbihan Association 

Communes of Morbihan